Ioana Crăciunescu (born 1950) is a Romanian actress and poet.

Biography
Ioana, also named Luminita, Crăciunescu, was born in Bucharest,  the daughter of a civil engineer. She studied at the Caragiale Academy of Theatrical Arts and Cinematography in her native city and in 1973 became a member of the Nottara Theatre Company. She has published six volumes of collected poetry beginning with Duminica absentă (Sunday absent) in 1980 for which she won the Writers' Union of Romania Prize the following year.

She made her film debut in 1974 and achieved her first major success in 1979 as Ana Baciu in the film Blestemul pământului, blestemul iubirii (The curse of the land, the curse of love). In 1991, she went to France to continue her acting career, primarily as a stage actress. Fifteen years later, she returned to Romania for a brief period and since then has divided her time between the two countries.

Awards and honours
In 2009, she received the Nichita Stănescu National Poetry Award from the Romanian Ministry of Culture.

Publications
& Scrisori dintr-un cîmp cu maci : [versuri] , 1977
 Supa de ceapă, 1981
 Iarnă clinică : versuri, 1983
 Maşinăria cu aburi : versuri, 1984
 Caietul cu adnotări, 1988
 Hiver clinique : poèmes, 1996
 Du front et des griffes, 1998

References

1950 births
Living people
20th-century Romanian poets
Romanian women poets
20th-century Romanian actresses
Actresses from Bucharest
Romanian film actresses
Romanian stage actresses
Caragiale National University of Theatre and Film alumni
20th-century Romanian women writers
21st-century Romanian poets
21st-century Romanian actresses
21st-century Romanian women writers